The 20th New Brunswick Legislative Assembly represented New Brunswick between April 27, 1865, and May 9, 1866.

The assembly sat at the pleasure of the Governor of New Brunswick Arthur Charles Hamilton-Gordon.

Edwin A. Vail was chosen as speaker.

The anti-Confederation Party led by Albert James Smith formed the government.

In April 1866, the non-elected Legislative Council passed a reply to the throne speech supporting confederation, which was accepted by Governor Gordon. Smith and his administration resigned in protest of what they believed to be a violation of the fundamentals of responsible government. The assembly was dissolved and an election was called.

History

Members 

Notes:

References 
Journal of the House of Assembly of ... New Brunswick from ... April to ... June, 1865 ... (1865)
 History of New Brunswick Provincial Election Campaigns and Platforms 1866–1974, CA Woodward (1976) 

Terms of the New Brunswick Legislature
1865 in Canada
1866 in Canada
1865 establishments in New Brunswick
1866 disestablishments in New Brunswick